Henry  Burton-Peters (12 January 1792 – 24 November 1874 ) was an English Whig and  Liberal  politician who sat in the House of Commons from 1830 to 1837.

Peters was the son of Henry Peters and Charlotte Mary Morrison, daughter of General George Morrison.

In 1830, Burton-Peters was elected as a Member of Parliament (MP) for Beverley. He held the seat until 1837.

Burton-Peters married three times. He married his third wife Mary Cartwright in 1870. They lived at 35 Brock Street, Bath.

References

External links
 

1792 births
1874 deaths
UK MPs 1832–1835
UK MPs 1830–1831
UK MPs 1831–1832
UK MPs 1835–1837
Members of the Parliament of the United Kingdom for English constituencies